Mouzieys-Panens is a commune in the Tarn department in southern France.

Geography
The commune is traversed by the Cérou river.

Monuments
The village is dominated by a castle that was built in the 12th century by Guillaume de Cadolhe. It was later fortified during the Hundred Years' War. It served as an outlook post for Cordes-sur-Ciel. In  1566, the castle came into possession of Count Bernard de Rabastens. It was the scene of battles and was set to fire. In the 18th century the castle was rebuilt and, now demilitarised, it serves as mairie.

Saint Michael's Church at the bottom of the village is a classified monument.

See also
Communes of the Tarn department

References

Communes of Tarn (department)